William Gaines (1824–1865) was a freed slave, minister, and community representative in Savannah, Georgia. He was one of the church leaders who met with the Secretary of War and Major General William Tecumseh Sherman in Savannah in April 1865, three months after the end of the American Civil War. 

Gaines was born into slavery in Wilkes County, Georgia. He was owned by Robert Toombs, who served in the U.S. Senate, and his brother Gabriel Toombs. Gaines was freed by the Union Army during the American Civil War.

Gaines was a preacher at the Methodist Episcopal (M.E.) Church (Andrew's Chapel). He later moved to the A.M.E. church with split off over the issue of slavery. As of 1865, he had ministered for 16 years and was 41 years old. Fellow A.M.E. church leader and bishop Wesley John Gaines was his brother. He was involved in the foundation of Jackson Chapel, and family members have continued to live in the area.

References

1824 births
1865 deaths
19th-century American slaves
People from Wilkes County, Georgia